Karhunen is a Finnish surname. Notable people with the surname include:

 Jorma Karhunen (1913–2002), Finnish WW II fighter ace
 Kari Karhunen (1915–1992), Finnish probabilist and mathematical statistician
 Esko Karhunen (1928–2016), Finnish baseball player
 Tomi Karhunen (born 1989), Finnish ice hockey goaltender

Finnish-language surnames